Służewiec Przemysłowy, originally known as the Industrial–Storage District of Służewiec, is a neighbourhood of the city of Warsaw, Poland, located within the district of Mokotów, within the Municipal Information System area (neighbourhood) of Służewiec. It mostly consists of office buildings.

History
The oldest known mention of Służewiec in documentation comes from 1378. In said documents, it was listed as one of 17 villages of the landed property of Służewo. It was a village attached to nearby village of Służewo (currently known as Służew), and was listed to have an area of 9 voloks (equivalent to 1.616 km² or 0.624 square miles), making it the biggest on the list. In 1411, the village was given the Kulm law privileges by duke Janusz I of Warsaw, ruler of the Duchy of Warsaw.

On 27 September 1938, Służew and Służewiec were incorporated into the city of Warsaw. The area had been destroyed in 1944 by the Nazi Germany, during the Second World War, as part of the destruction of Warsaw.

In 1951, the area of Służewiec and Zbarż, had been designated as the industrial area of the Industrial–Storage District of Służewiec (Polish: Dzielnica Przemysłowo-Składowa „Służewiec”), later known as Służewiec Przemysłowy (Industrial Służewiec). It was planned to construct 60 factories and industrial plants in the area, as well as residential buildings for 26 thousand people. The buildings were constructed in the large panel system technique, marking it as one of the first instances of such system being used in Poland. The designated area covered around 2.6 km² (1 sq mi). The construction begun in 1952. In the early 1970s, in the industrail area worked around 20 000 people. The corporations in the area were: the Tewa Semiconductors Factory (Polish: Fabryka Półprzewodników „Tewa”, Lifting Devices Factories (Polish: Zakłady Urządzeń Dźwigowych), Elwa Radio Components Factory (Polish: Fabryka Podzespołów Radiowych „Elwa”), Radio Cenamics Plants (Polish: Zakłady Ceramiki Radiowej), and Służewiec Meat-Packing Factories (Polish: Zakłady Mięsne „Służewiec”.

In the 1990s, the industrial activity in the area of Służewiec Przemysłowy and nearby western part of Ksawerów, went to a hold. As such, it had caused the appearance on the Real estate market of huge and developed estates, located near the city centre and the Warsaw Chopin Airport. It had then contributed to the development of business industry in the area, and eventually leading to the creation of the biggest complex of office buildings in Poland One of the first of new infestations in the area was the construction of Curtis Plaza office building in 1992, located at 18 Wołoska Street. From 1995 to 2001, in the area had been build the complex of office buildings known as Mokotów Business Park, located in the area of Domaniewska and Postępu Streets. In 2000, in the area had been opened Westfield Mokotów (originally known as Galeria Mokotów), one of the biggest shopping centres in the city. By 2019, in the area had been build 83 office buildings. They were mostly build without city oversight, and contributed to the development of the office monoculture. In 2019, the area begun losing its status of office centre, to the district of Wola.

Notes

References

Neighbourhoods of Mokotów
1951 establishments in Poland
Populated places established in 1951